Whangara is a small community in the northeast of New Zealand's North Island, located between Gisborne and Tolaga Bay, five kilometres southwest of Gable End Foreland and two kilometres east of State Highway 35.

The settlement features prominently in the early history of the Ngāti Porou iwi, as the site where Tamatea, captain of the Tākitimu canoe settled on arriving in New Zealand. Canoe races were held at nearby Pikopiko-i-whiti, with the people watching from a hill called Puke-hapopo. The place name may be cognate with Fa'ara on Taha'a island in French Polynesia.

Whangara was the location and setting for Witi Ihimaera's novel The Whale Rider and its film adaptation.

Parks

Te Tapuwae o Rongokako Marine Reserve is a marine reserve covering 2,450 hectares of coastline south of Whangara, which is managed by the Department of Conservation.

Marae

The local Whāngārā Marae is a meeting place for the Ngāti Porou hapū of Ngāti Konohi. It includes a wharenui, known as Whitirēia or Waho Te Rangi.

In October 2020, the Government committed $49,626 from the Provincial Growth Fund to upgrade the marae, creating an estimated 3.4 jobs.

Education

Whangara School is a Year 1–8 co-educational state primary school. In 2019, it was a decile 2 school with a roll of 78.

References

External links
 1949 photograph of Whangara

Populated places in the Gisborne District